Leslie Herbert 'Les' Rippon (30 December 1875 – 27 September 1949) was an Australian rules footballer who played for the Melbourne Football Club in the Victorian Football League (VFL). He became one of the club's first premiership players, playing in the 1900 VFL Grand Final, under the captaincy of Dick Wardill. Rippon made his debut against  in round 1 of the 1898 VFL season, at the Melbourne Cricket Ground.

Family
The son of Samuel Rippon (1845-1897), and Lucretia Eliza Rippon (1848-1899), née Butterworth, Leslie Herbert Rippon was born at St Kilda, Victoria on 30 December 1875.

His brothers, Norm and Harold, also played for Melbourne in the VFL.

References

External links

 

Demonwiki profile

1875 births
Melbourne Football Club players
Australian rules footballers from Melbourne
1949 deaths
Melbourne Football Club Premiership players
One-time VFL/AFL Premiership players
People from St Kilda, Victoria